Mishutinskaya is a rural locality (a village) and the administrative center of Mishutinskoye Rural Settlement, Vozhegodsky District, Vologda Oblast, Russia. The population was 135 as of 2002.

Geography 
Mishutinskaya is located 66 km east of Vozhega (the district's administrative centre) by road. Patrakeyevskaya is the nearest rural locality.

References 

Rural localities in Vozhegodsky District